Else Jarlbak (8 August 1911 – 16 February 1963) was a Danish film actress. She appeared in 35 films between 1934 and 1961. She was born in Copenhagen, Denmark and died in Denmark.

Filmography

 Lynet (1934)
 De bør forelske dem (1935)
 En fuldendt gentleman (1937)
 Inkognito (1937)
 Pas på Svinget i Solby (1940)
 Frøken Kirkemus (1941)
 Teatertosset (1944)
 Man elsker kun en gang (1945)
 Diskret Ophold (1946)
 The Swedenhielm Family (1947)
 Hr. Petit (1948)
 Tre år efter (1948)
 Vi vil ha' et barn (1949)
 Det hændte i København (1949)
 Din fortid er glemt (1949)
 De røde heste (1950)
 Susanne (1950)
 I gabestokken (1950)
 Vores fjerde far (1951)
 Dorte (1951)
 Avismanden (1952)
 Rekrut 67, Petersen (1952)
 Kærlighedsdoktoren (1952)
 Husmandstøsen (1952)
 Ta' Pelle med (1952)
 För min heta ungdoms skull (1952)
 Store løb, Det (1952)
 The Crime of Tove Andersen (1953)
 Far til fire (1953)
 Min datter Nelly (1955)
 Tante Tut fra Paris (1956)
 Der var engang en gade (1957)
 Skibet er ladet med (1960)
 Min kone fra Paris (1961)
 Sorte Shara (1961)

References

External links

1911 births
1963 deaths
Danish film actresses
Actresses from Copenhagen
20th-century Danish actresses